The Tossers are an American six-piece Celtic punk band from Chicago, Illinois, United States, formed in July 1993. They have toured with Murphy's Law, Streetlight Manifesto, Catch 22, Dropkick Murphys, The Reverend Horton Heat, Flogging Molly, Street Dogs, Clutch, Sick of it All and Mastodon. They opened for The Pogues in New York City on St. Patrick's Day in 2007. The Tossers were honored to play the Kennedy Center in May 2016.

The band pre-dates more well-known Celtic punk bands such as the Dropkick Murphys and Flogging Molly, which formed in 1996 and 1997, respectively. Their latest album, entitled Smash the Windows, was released on March 3, 2017.

Band members
Current
T. Duggins - vocals and mandolin
Aaron Duggins - tin whistle
Mike Pawula - guitar
Fred Frey - drums
Peter Muschong - bass
Emily Ruth Constantinou - violin

Former
Bones - drums
Rebecca Manthe - fiddle
Brian Dwyer - guitar
Clay Hansen - banjo
Lynn Bower - vocals
Jason Loveall - fiddle
Nate Van Allen - guitar
Dan Shaw - bass
Scott Lucas - bass (touring)

Discography

Albums and singles
The Pint of No Return (1994)
We'll Never Be Sober Again (1996) Folk You Records
  The Tossers/The Arrivals (split single) (1998) Smilin Bob Records
Long Dim Road (2000) Thick Records
  Citizen Fish/The Tossers (split single) (2001) Thick Records
The First League Out from Land (EP) (2001) Thick Records
Communication & Conviction: Last Seven Years (2001) Thick Records
Purgatory (2003) Thick Records
Live at The Metro 18 November 2004 (eMusic digital album) (2004) The Metro/eMusicLive
The Valley of the Shadow of Death (2005) Victory Records
Agony (2007) Victory Records
Gloatin' and Showboatin': Live on St. Patrick's Day (CD/DVD) (2008) Victory Records
On a Fine Spring Evening (2008) Victory Records
The Emerald City (2013) Victory Records
Smash the Windows (2017)
The Tossers (30th Anniversary) (2023)

Compilations
Eat Your Corn:  The 2nd DeKalb Compilation (1995) with "Buckets of Beer" and "When You Get Here"
Magnetic Curses: A Chicago Punk Rock Compilation (2000) with "The Crutch (Alternate Version)"
Love & Rebellion: A Thick Records Sampler (2002) with "The Pub (Alternate Version)" and "Dancing Shoes"
OIL: Chicago Punk Refined (2003) with "Teehan's"

T. Duggins solo discography
Undone (2006)
Mean It Man: A Thick Records Document (2005) with "Larkin" & "Irish Rover"

References

External links

Victory Records website
Thick Records website
The Tossers' Purevolume page
Interview with Dan & Mike (2007)

1993 establishments in Illinois
Punk rock groups from Illinois
Irish-American culture in Chicago
Musical groups established in 1993
Musical groups from Chicago
Celtic punk groups
Victory Records artists